Alexander Ilyin may refer to:

 Aleksandr Aleksandrovich Ilyin (born 1983), Russian actor, poet, singer and songwriter
 Alexander Ilyin (mathematician) (born 1973), Russian mathematician